Tema Community 5 is a residential area in Tema in the Greater Accra Region of Ghana. The town is known for the Tema Secondary School.  The school is a second cycle institution.

References

Populated places in the Greater Accra Region
Tema